Lombardy elected its third delegation to the Italian Senate on May 25, 1958. This election was a part of national Italian general election of 1958 even if, according to the Italian Constitution, every senatorial challenge in each Region is a single and independent race.

Lombardy obtained two more seats to the Senate, following the redistricting subsequent to the 1951 Census.

The election was won by the centrist Christian Democracy, as it happened at national level. All Lombard provinces gave a majority or at least a plurality to the winning party.

Background
Even if Amintore Fanfani's Christian Democracy weakened in this election, Lombardy remained a stronghold for the national leading party.

As it happened five years before, the Communists obtained some seats in the agricultural south, while the Socialists remarked their strength in the Milanese industrial neighbourhood. The centre-left Italian Democratic Socialist Party obtained two seats in Milan, a city led by Democratic Socialist mayor Virgilio Ferrari, while the rightist Italian Social Movement and the Italian Liberal Party obtained some good results in the bourgeois center of Milan.

Electoral system
The electoral system for the Senate was a strange hybrid which established a form of proportional representation into FPTP-like constituencies. A candidate needed a landslide victory of more than 65% of votes to obtain a direct mandate. All constituencies where this result was not reached entered into an at-large calculation based upon the D'Hondt method to distribute the seats between the parties, and candidates with the best percentages of suffrages inside their party list were elected.

Results

|-
|- bgcolor="#E9E9E9"
!rowspan="1" align="left" valign="top"|Party
!rowspan="1" align="center" valign="top"|votes
!rowspan="1" align="center" valign="top"|votes (%)
!rowspan="1" align="center" valign="top"|seats
!rowspan="1" align="center" valign="top"|swing
|-
!align="left" valign="top"|Christian Democracy
|valign="top"|1,805,779
|valign="top"|44.8
|valign="top"|16
|valign="top"|=
|-
!align="left" valign="top"|Italian Socialist Party
|valign="top"|747,266
|valign="top"|18.5
|valign="top"|7
|valign="top"|1
|-
!align="left" valign="top"|Italian Communist Party
|valign="top"|746,880
|valign="top"|18.5
|valign="top"|6
|valign="top"|=
|-
!align="left" valign="top"|Italian Democratic Socialist Party
|valign="top"|248,824
|valign="top"|6.2
|valign="top"|2
|valign="top"|1
|-
!align="left" valign="top"|Italian Liberal Party
|valign="top"|184,701
|valign="top"|4.6
|valign="top"|1
|valign="top"|1
|-
!align="left" valign="top"|Italian Social Movement
|valign="top"|151,330
|valign="top"|3.8
|valign="top"|1
|valign="top"|=
|-
!align="left" valign="top"|Others
|valign="top"|147,523
|valign="top"|3.6
|valign="top"|-
|valign="top"|1
|- bgcolor="#E9E9E9"
!rowspan="1" align="left" valign="top"|Total parties
!rowspan="1" align="right" valign="top"|4,032,303
!rowspan="1" align="right" valign="top"|100.0
!rowspan="1" align="right" valign="top"|33
!rowspan="1" align="right" valign="top"|2
|}

Sources: Italian Ministry of the Interior

Constituencies

|-
|- bgcolor="#E9E9E9"
!align="left" valign="top"|N°
!align="center" valign="top"|Constituency
!align="center" valign="top"|Elected
!align="center" valign="top"|Party
!align="center" valign="top"|Votes %
!align="center" valign="top"|Others
|-
|align="left"|1
|align="left"|Bergamo
|align="left"|Cristoforo Pezzini
|align="left"|Christian Democracy
|align="left"|55.7%
|align="left"|
|-
|align="left"|2
|align="left"|Clusone
|align="left"|Pietro Bellora
|align="left"|Christian Democracy
|align="left"|67.4%
|align="left"|
|-
|align="left"|3
|align="left"|Treviglio
|align="left"|Daniele Turani
|align="left"|Christian Democracy
|align="left"|63.1%
|align="left"|
|-
|align="left"|4
|align="left"|Brescia
|align="left"|Angelo Buizza
|align="left"|Christian Democracy
|align="left"|46.7%
|align="left"|
|-
|align="left"|5
|align="left"|Breno
|align="left"|Angelo Cemmi
|align="left"|Christian Democracy
|align="left"|61.2%
|align="left"|
|-
|align="left"|6
|align="left"|Chiari
|align="left"|Pietro Cenini
|align="left"|Christian Democracy
|align="left"|59.1%
|align="left"|
|-
|align="left"|7
|align="left"|Salò
|align="left"|Francesco Zane
|align="left"|Christian Democracy
|align="left"|53.8%
|align="left"|
|-
|align="left"|8
|align="left"|Como
|align="left"|None elected
|align="left"|
|align="left"|
|align="left"|Pasquale Valsecchi (DC) 45.9%
|-
|align="left"|9
|align="left"|Lecco
|align="left"|Pietro Amigoni
|align="left"|Christian Democracy
|align="left"|58.1%
|align="left"|
|-
|align="left"|10
|align="left"|Cantù
|align="left"|Lorenzo SpallinoUgo Bonafini
|align="left"|Christian DemocracyItalian Socialist Party
|align="left"|56.4%20.9%
|align="left"|
|-
|align="left"|11
|align="left"|Cremona
|align="left"|Bruno GombiEmilio Zanoni
|align="left"|Italian Communist PartyItalian Socialist Party
|align="left"|26.2%21.3%
|align="left"|
|-
|align="left"|12
|align="left"|Crema
|align="left"|Ennio Zelioli
|align="left"|Christian Democracy
|align="left"|52.5%
|align="left"|
|-
|align="left"|13
|align="left"|Mantua
|align="left"|Alceo Negri
|align="left"|Italian Socialist Party
|align="left"|24.4%
|align="left"|Ernesto Zanardi (PCI) 23.7%
|-
|align="left"|14
|align="left"|Ostiglia
|align="left"|Teodosio AimoniUnconstitutional result 
|align="left"|Italian Communist Party
|align="left"|32.1%24.8%
|align="left"| Seat ceded to Bonafini
|-
|align="left"|15
|align="left"|Milan 1
|align="left"|Giorgio Bergamasco
|align="left"|Italian Liberal Party
|align="left"|16.5% 
|align="left"|
|-
|align="left"|16
|align="left"|Milan 2
|align="left"|Gastone Nencioni
|align="left"|Italian Social Movement
|align="left"|7.4%
|align="left"|
|-
|align="left"|17
|align="left"|Milan 3
|align="left"|Edgardo Savio
|align="left"|Italian Democratic Socialist Party
|align="left"|9.9%
|align="left"|
|-
|align="left"|18
|align="left"|Milan 4
|align="left"|Edgardo Lami Starnuti
|align="left"|Italian Democratic Socialist Party
|align="left"|9.9%
|align="left"|
|-
|align="left"|19
|align="left"|Milan 5
|align="left"|None elected
|align="left"|
|align="left"|
|align="left"|
|-
|align="left"|20
|align="left"|Milan 6
|align="left"|'''Piero MontagnaniGiuseppe Roda
|align="left"|Italian Communist PartyItalian Socialist Party
|align="left"|28.6%23.8%
|align="left"|
|-
|align="left"|21
|align="left"|Abbiategrasso
|align="left"|None elected
|align="left"|
|align="left"|
|align="left"|Emanuele Samek Lodovici (DC) 44.8%Carlo Arnaudi (PSI) 20.7%
|-
|align="left"|22
|align="left"|Rho
|align="left"|Guido CorbelliniArialdo Banfi
|align="left"|Christian DemocracyItalian Socialist Party
|align="left"|46.2%20.9%
|align="left"|
|-
|align="left"|23
|align="left"|Monza
|align="left"|Gianmaria Cornaggia
|align="left"|Christian Democracy
|align="left"|48.9%
|align="left"|
|-
|align="left"|24
|align="left"|Vimercate
|align="left"|Cesare Merzagora
|align="left"|Christian Democracy (Indep.)
|align="left"|54.8%
|align="left"|
|-
|align="left"|25
|align="left"|Lodi
|align="left"|Francesco Scotti
|align="left"|Italian Communist Party
|align="left"|26.3%
|align="left"|
|-
|align="left"|26
|align="left"|Pavia
|align="left"|Pietro Vergani
|align="left"|Italian Communist Party
|align="left"|28.0%
|align="left"|Giuseppe Faravelli (PSDI) 5.1%
|-
|align="left"|27
|align="left"|Voghera
|align="left"|''None elected
|align="left"|
|align="left"|
|align="left"|
|-
|align="left"|28
|align="left"|Vigevano
|align="left"|Carlo Lombardi
|align="left"|Italian Communist Party
|align="left"|36.0%
|align="left"|
|-
|align="left"|29
|align="left"|Sondrio
|align="left"|Attilio Piccioni
|align="left"|Christian Democracy
|align="left"|57.7%
|align="left"|
|-
|align="left"|30
|align="left"|Varese
|align="left"|Noè PajettaAntonio Greppi
|align="left"|Christian DemocracyItalian Socialist Party
|align="left"|45.5%21.5%
|align="left"|
|-
|align="left"|31
|align="left"|Busto Arsizio 
|align="left"|Natale SanteroMario Grampa
|align="left"|Christian DemocracyItalian Socialist Party
|align="left"|47.8%22.9%
|align="left"|
|}

Senators with a direct mandate have bold percentages. Please remember that the electoral system was, in the other cases, a form of proportional representation and not a FPTP race: so candidates winning with a simple plurality could have (and usually had) a candidate (always a Christian democrat) with more votes in their constituency.

Substitutions
Enesto Zanardi for Mantua (23.7%) replaced Teodosio Aimoni in 1959. Reason: resignation.
Emanuele Samek Lodovici for Abbiategrasso (44.8%) replaced Pietro Bellora in 1959. Reason: death.
Carlo Arnaudi for Abbiategrasso (20.7%) replaced Mario Grampa in 1961. Reason: death.
Giuseppe Faravelli for Pavia (5.1%) replaced Edgardo Savio in 1961. Reason: death.
Pasquale Valsecchi for Como (45.9%) replaced Lorenzo Spallino in 1962. Reason: death.

Notes

Elections in Lombardy
1958 elections in Italy